Events from the year 1908 in China.

Incumbents
Emperor: Guangxu Emperor

Events
March 4 – One of earlier financial service founded in this nation, China Bank of Communications was founded.
July 22 — The Qing government issues the Outline of Imperial Constitution, based on the Meiji Constitution of Japan, which establishes a framework for local and national legislative elections to be held.
December 2 — Aisin Gioro Puyi ascended the throne at the age of three as the Xuantong Emperor, the twelfth and final ruler of the Qing dynasty.

Births
 Yin Linping
 Zhao Shangzhi
 Zhou Yang

Deaths
November 14 - Guangxu Emperor (b. 1871)
November 15 - Empress Dowager Cixi (b. 1835)

References

 
1900s in China
Years of the 20th century in China